Tyler Allen may refer to:

 Tyler Allen (motorsport) (born 1987), American NASCAR race engineer
 Tyler Allen (soccer) (born 1998), American soccer player